Lord chief justice may refer to:

 Lord Chief Justice of England and Wales
 Lord Chief Justice of Ireland
 Lord Chief Justice of Northern Ireland
 Lord Chief Justice of the Common Pleas
 Lord Chief Justice of the King's Bench for Ireland

See also
 Lord President of the Court of Session